

How does the queue management system work? 

Queue management is the process of managing the experiences of customers waiting in the queue to improve business.This system quantifies queuing demand for your business, such that your staff can be made aware in real-time and make adjustments to their service dispensation

A powerful queue management software facilitates a seamless customer journey by providing different solutions ranging from Linear and Virtual queuing systems to appointment booking options and a more sophisticated method like queue management mobile app.

A queue management system is used to control queues. Queues of people form in various situations and locations in a queue area. The process of queue formation and propagation is defined as queuing theory.

What is a queue management system?
A queue management system is a set of tools and sub-systems assist in controlling customers’ flow, managing the waiting time and enhancing customers’ experience for multiple industries including banking, healthcare, retails, education, government, and telecom.

Advantages

The queue management system already developed for decades. Most of the Queue management systems are ticket based currently, customers take a ticket when they enter a bank, post office, telcom store etc. and proceed to the service counter when called, there are no more physical lineup. People siting and not lineup anymore, with this better service system, the penetration rate of queue management system is 100% in some industries/countries; it is a must have system in these sites.

Types of queue

Structured queues
Here people form a queue in a fixed, predictable position, such as at supermarket checkouts, and other retail locations such as banks or airport security.
In the field of facilities management, structured queues are commonly known with different names like "Queue Managers" or "Crowd Controllers" or "Public Guidance Systems".
Very often, queue management systems are set up to manage ticket ranking for a service (with or without a numbered ticket) with identification and thus enable a serene and stress-free waiting.
Extending the different possibilities, planned reception by appointment and remotely rank allocation on or through Short Message Service can also be included. A more rudimentary (or in some cases, supplementary) manual element to structured queue management involves the addition of a member of human staff to deliver a system, monitoring structured queue lengths in order to guide people in a queue or to make adjustments to speed up service (e.g. fetching more cashiers). Such systems are used in UK supermarkets, for example, where the addition of a 'host' role or Customer Service Manager may occur.

Unstructured queues
Where people form a queue in unpredictable and varying locations and directions. This is often the case in some forms of retail, taxi queues, ATMs and at periods of high demand in many situations. In the busiest places, physical barriers and guides are used to funnel people into a line as they arrive.

Mobile queue, virtual queue, and online queue

Allowing customers to use their mobile phone to view real-time queue data and select a reason that they want to visit your service center.  Customers are free to carry on their day and don't have to wait in a waiting area for too long.  Customers can wait anywhere else while waiting for their turns. They can receive notifications via SMS,  App or Emails informing them about theire turn  and when ready to be seen, they are called forward for service.

Mobile queues especially the online ones can also include real-time queue data statistics as well as real-time customer feedback. Qiwii.id is one example of queuing system that can provide real time data about queue and the estimation of waiting time.

Mobile queues require the customer to install apps to their phone before getting into the queue. The time to install may extend the persons actual wait time for the first visit. There are many option of queuing app and not every business uses the same app, customers can end up with hundreds of apps on their device. The one stop app for many businesses and institutions could be a better option in customer point of view. Mobile queue app for single business/institution will only be beneficial for customers that visit the same place on a regular basis.

Queue measurement and management techniques
Various queue measurement and management techniques exist:

Physical barrier
They aimed at guiding queue formation and organizing it in the most efficient way.

Signage and signaling systems
Traditional queue management systems rely on customers of that business, entering the business and using a free-standing kiosk to select the reason for their visit.  These type of systems use LCD screens to manage customers by way of indicating their wait time and place in the queue.  These aim to provide information to people queuing to aid efficient queue formation and flow, as well as setting service expectations.

Newer technologies such as utilization of a customer mobile phone, allow customers to view queue data and join a queue prior to arriving at the service centre are seen to be more customer friendly.  Customers who use this technology do not have to join a physical line or wait in a confined area watching LCD screens.  Solutions that use the customers mobile phone, interact with the customer keeping them updated as to their place in the queue and when ready, call the customer forward for service.  Solutions such as these improve efficiency within the business and also improve customer feedback surveys.

Automatic queue measurement systems
These use a variety of measurement technologies which predict and measure queue lengths and waiting times and provide management information to help service levels and resource deployment.

Automatic queue measurement systems for small structured queues
Automatic queue measurement systems are designed to help managers in two ways – first, through enhanced customer service; second by improving efficiency and reducing costs.
They use people counting sensors at entrances and above checkout lanes/queue areas to accurately detect the number and behavior of people in the queue. Built-in predictive algorithms can provide advance notice on how many checkouts or service points will be needed to meet demand. Dashboards, available on a computer monitor or mobile PDA device, are often used to provide a range of information, such as dynamic queue length, waiting time data, and checkout performance on the shop floor. In the event that performance falls towards a minimum service level, in supermarkets or banks management teams can be automatically alerted beforehand, allowing them time to proactively manage the situation. Key measurements produced are:

 The number of people entering the store
 Queue length
 Average wait time
 Till operator or bank teller idle time
 Total wait time.

A number of the large UK supermarket chains use such systems for service level and resource management.

Automatic queue measurement systems for large and unstructured queues
Where queues form in unpredictable locations and/or extend beyond a relatively small queue area, overhead detector based queue measurement systems cannot be effectively used. Alternative technology solutions using wide area queue sampling are effective in these situations. One method is using Bluetooth detection from mobile telephones held by people in the queue. Although a sampling technique, as typically 10 – 30% of telephone have active Bluetooth at any one time,  it gives a reasonably accurate measurement of average queue wait times where long queues are present. A precise but more expensive method is the use of a people counter. Measuring and counting can be particularly useful in situations such as airport security where a large volume of people pass through an area in varying flow patterns and constantly varying physical locations.

Enterprise grade queue management system
With the improvement of network connectivity, the organizations are exploring for deployment of a centralized computerized queue management system suitable as enterprise grade solution. Computerized queue management system is becoming a part of IT projects within organizations for taking the initiative to use their existing hardware and database to reduce the cost of investment, taking leverage of using internal network connectivity within the branches for central system management and reporting on the customer flow data.

Automatic queue measurement systems for a complete reception solution
Reception management solutions allow managing flows and the purposes of visits from initial contact to the service given.
These intelligent management systems allow to increase productivity and sales and reduce operating costs by ensuring that customer is served by the staff that are the most qualified according to the request.
Reception management solutions are above all a way of increasing customer satisfaction by reducing the perceived and actual waiting time, creating a pleasant environment and a fair reception.
These innovative reception management solutions also contribute to the satisfaction of working teams by reducing the amount of stress and optimizing the processing of requests.
Reception management solutions also enable to generate data about how customers wait and how staff can best serve them. This type of information assists in improving organization processes and in increasing the quality of customer service.

Reception management solutions cover 6 stages:
 Information (can also be done by video, SMS, Internet ...)
 Allocation & direction (can also be done by video, SMS, Internet ...)
 Waiting & communication (can also be done by video, SMS, Internet ...)
 Call (can also be done by video, SMS, Internet ...)
 Reception
 Management

Besides these stages, for a complete reception solution, it is useful and efficient to include appointments management, agenda planning and future flows and resources forecasting. These modular solutions, adaptable to various sectors (Retail, Health, Telecommunications, Finance, Transport, Public Sector...), can suit to the management of a simple queue to centralized multiple site organization.

Information / customer arrival
 Inform customers of the expected waiting time (Video, SMS, Internet...)
 Announce the customer's arrival if he/she has an appointment
 Provide for the customer to be recognised by name, number, bar code, identity card etc., by a terminal or receptionist.

Allocation and direction
 Dedicated terminals in a self-service area or reception that allows customers to take their place in the queue for a service
 Registration can also be made using the Internet, SmartPhone...
 Orientation in the virtual line corresponding to his/her request

Waiting time and communication
 Adjust waiting time according to the importance of the service to be provided
 Make waiting both active and interactive so that it is seen to be as pleasant as possible (Video, Interactive communication, Advertising...) and remove waiting with mobility tools (phone, Smartphone).
 Allow visitors freedom of movement while keeping them informed about the expected waiting time or giving them a "guaranteed reception time".
 Provide Mobile Customer Interface which is accessible via a mobile browser. URL of such interface is received via welcome SMS. Having such feature in place, customers can track the progress of the queue all the time and therefore it is not required to be physically in the shop all the time. Customers are informed about critical changes in the queue (i.e. the customer is at the 3rd position) via SMS and Mobile Interface so that customer comes back to the shop in case he/she is out. Feedback collection can also be done via such Mobile Interface.

Call/reception
Provide various options for establishing contact:
 The salesperson/member of staff calls customers and recognizes them by a photo, name, symbol or sequence number etc.
 Customers/visitors are called by name, number, code etc., on a video screen, display, voice synthesis etc. and go to the window or counter-indicated.
 The call can be made to a mobile phone using a text message, a smartphone or by a beeper.

In case of a common queue guide for several call forward windows (cash, desks), a LED or video screen at the head of the queue displays the number called with a directional arrow.
The number called should also be able to be shown by a number, arrow, floor-plan etc.
When waiting times may be long, a possible first stage is to use a beeper or text message or Smartphone message* to send customers to a final waiting area, where they are free to move around the store or area.
If the reception procedure takes several stages, or if additional waiting time is necessary before the provision of the service can be concluded, it should be possible to place visitors on hold for subsequent treatment.

Real time management and data collection for statistical analysis
Managers have access to a tracking screen with warnings (visual, sound, text messages or e-mails) which enable overall monitoring and control of the reception system. Nevertheless, the system positions backups automatically, to ensure that the target waiting levels per service are respected, as a function of the allocation of salespersons/staff to the services and the forecasts and actual arrivals of customers/visitors.

In the centralized deployment in enterprise-grade queue management solution, the management console allows configuring all the parameter to run the token dispenser, a keypad for service desk, displays, Announcement and the user management.

Complete statistical reports enable tables and graphs of the following parameters and variables to be interlinked and presented: time periods, waiting times, handling times, times present, services provided, reasons for visits etc. These reports are configurable temporal documents for different needs, displaying functions with 1 or 2 variables. They can be consulted or personalized and sent directly to managers by e-mail.

Forecasting and appointments
To be able to estimate future visitor flows and resource requirements by department and time period, as a function of statistical data and the designation of past and future days. This enables scheduling of reception resources to be optimized. To be able to make appointments or anticipate flows arrival, by direct contact, telephone or Internet, and mix appointments with walk-in visits using the same resources, by ensuring that appointments are automatically handled at the planned time.

Traditional Queue Management has always utilized expensive touch screen kiosks however, newer technology solutions utilize the customers mobile phone.  Using a customer mobile phone to interact with the customer ensures that customers are free to do what they want and not have to wait in a waiting area.  The customer will receive notifications on their mobile phone and when ready, they are called forward for service.

Queuing Rule of Thumb

References

Queue management
Queueing_theory